Windlight Studios was a computer animation and visual effects' company established in 1993, and based in Minneapolis, Minnesota. It was folded into the holdings of Canada's Nelvana studio in 1997. Its co-founder, Scott Dyer, became Nelvana's senior vice president in charge of production in late 2001.

References

 Maule, Christopher J. and Acheson, Archibald Lloyd Keith (2001). Much Ado About Culture: North American Trade Disputes, p. 122. University of Michigan Press. .

External links
 Official site (archived at the Wayback Machine)
 Corus Entertainment profile for co-founder Dyer

American animation studios
Defunct companies based in Minneapolis
Entertainment companies established in 1993
Corus Entertainment